Dragons of Light (1980) is a fantasy  anthology edited by American writer Orson Scott Card.

Contents 
 "The Ice Dragon" by George R. R. Martin (Illustrated by Alicia Austin)
 "The George Business" by Roger Zelazny (Illustrated by Geof Darrow)
 "One Winter in Eden" by Michael Bishop (Illustrated by Val Lakey Lindahn and John Lakey)
 "A Drama of Dragons" by Craig Shaw Gardner (Illustrated by Gini Shurtleff)
 "Silken Dragon" by Steven Edward McDonald (Illustrated by Ron Miller)
 "Dragon Lore" by Steve Rasnic Tem (Illustrated by Victoria Poyser)
 "Eagle Worm" by Jessica Amanda Salmonson (Illustrated by Glen Edwards)
 "The Dragon of Dunloon" by Arthur Dembling (Illustrated by Dileen Marsh)
 "If I Die Before I Wake" by Greg Bear, including illustrations
 "As Above, So Below" by John M. Ford (Illustrated by Judy King-Rieniets)
 "Cockfight" by Jane Yolen (Illustrated by Terri Windling)
 "From Bach to Broccoli" by Richard Kearns (Illustrated by Geof Darrow)
 "Dragon Touched" by Dave Smeds (Illustrated by Michael Hague)

See also
Dragons of Darkness

1980 anthologies
Fantasy anthologies
Books about dragons
Ace Books books
Books with cover art by Michael Whelan